Zhang Taiheng (5 March 1931 – 29 January 2005) was a general (shangjiang) of the People's Liberation Army (PLA). He was a delegate to the 6th, 7th and 8th National People's Congress. He was a member of the Standing Committee of the 9th Chinese People's Political Consultative Conference.

Biography
Zhang was born in Guangrao County, Shandong, on 5 March 1931. He enlisted in the Eighth Route Army in September 1944, and joined the Chinese Communist Party (CCP) in May 1948. During the Chinese Civil War, he served in the East China Field Army. 

After founding of the Communist State, he worked in the Nanjing Military Region. In June 1985, he became deputy commander of Chengdu Military Region, rising to commander in April 1990. He became commander of Jinan Military Region in October 1992, and served until November 1996.

On 29 January 2005, he died from an illness in Beijing, at the age of 73.

He was promoted to the rank of lieutenant general (zhongjiang) in 1988 and general (shangjiang) in June 1994.

References

1931 births
2005 deaths
People from Guangrao County
People's Liberation Army generals from Shandong
People's Republic of China politicians from Shandong
Chinese Communist Party politicians from Shandong
Commanders of the Chengdu Military Region
Commanders of the Jinan Military Region
Delegates to the 6th National People's Congress
Delegates to the 7th National People's Congress
Delegates to the 8th National People's Congress
Members of the Standing Committee of the 9th Chinese People's Political Consultative Conference